Carbon Plaza Mall is an indoor and outdoor shopping mall on the south side of Route 443 in Mahoning Township, Carbon County, Pennsylvania, just outside Lehighton. It is anchored by a Giant Supermarket and a Big Lots location and has an eight-screen theatre. Other major stores include Rent-A-Center and Rite Aid. There are several fast food outlets in the parking lot.

History 
Bright’s Department Store moved to the mall in 1976, and the store was later sold to Laneco in 1983. Mahoning Valley Cinema opened in December 1995, using part of the space previously occupied by Bright's Department Store. Carbon Dack Associates purchased the mall in January 1998. Medical services include OAA Orthopaedic Specialists and Blue Mountain Health System, which opened a cardiac care unit at the mall in April 2010. On December 9, 2011 Blue Mountain Health System closed its Health Works fitness center.

In late April 2020, Mahoning Valley Cinemas made the decision not to reopen due to the COVID-19 pandemic. FunTime Cinemas, after some renovations, announced they would reopen the former Mahoning Valley Cinemas in early 2021. Carbon Plaza Mall was sold to Larken Associates for $18 million in November 2021.

References

Shopping malls established in 1972
Shopping malls in Pennsylvania